Events in the year 2023 in Kerala

Incumbents

Events

January 
 January 3 - The 61st edition of Kerala School Kalolsavam commenced at Kozhikode. The event was conducted for the first time after COVID-19 pandemic and nearly 140,000 students participated in it.
 January 15 - India national cricket team vs Sri Lanka One Day International match held at Greenfield International Stadium with a low spectatorship of below one fifth the stadium capacity, owing to high ticket charges and disrespectful remarks by V. Abdurahiman.
 January 19 - Government of Kerala appoints former Indian National Congress leader K. V. Thomas as its special representative in New Delhi with cabinet rank and privileges.
 January 22 - PT - 7, a rogue wild Elephant tranquilized and captured by Wildlife Department, Government of Kerala near Dhoni, Palakkad.

February 

 February 5 - An enquiry on fake Birth certificate case in Kalamassery reveals incident of illegal Adoption of a girl child with help of health workers that took place in Government Medical College, Ernakulam.
 February 11 - VIswanadhan, a 46 year old tribal from Wayanad district found dead in premises of Government Medical College, Kozhikode. It is alleged that he was abused and man handled accusing theft.
 February 14 - Enforcement Directorate arrests former Indian Administrative Service official M. Sivasankaran, a close confidant of Pinarayi Vijayan in connection with Foreign Contribution (Regulation) Act, 2010 violations in Life Mission, a state funded housing project.
 February 17 - Biju Kurian a farmer from Kannur district who was part of a state government led delegation went absconding from Herzliya, Israel.
 February 22 - Enforcement Directorate attaches assets worth 305 crores of Joy Alukkas for Foreign Exchange Management Act violations and carrying out Hawala.
 February 23 - A state wide raid conducted by Vigilance & Anti-Corruption Bureau, Kerala finds that organized racket in state which siphons off money from Chief Minister Disaster Relief Fund (CMDRF).

March 

 March 2 - Massive fire burst out at Brahmapuram waste treatment plant in Kochi.
 March 3 - Students' Federation of India activists attacks Asianet News Network office at Kochi for telecasting a report regarding Narcotic Drugs & Psychotropic Substances abuse among school children.
 March 14 - Twelve day long fire at Brahmapuram waste dump brought into control. The Air quality index of Kochi hit historic low during the fire.
 March 15 - Scuffle took place outside speakers office of Kerala Legislative Assembly between LDF and UDF legislators. 
 March 18 - National Green Tribunal slaps 100 crore penalty on Kochi Municipal Corporation for Bhrahmapuram landfill fire.

See also 

 History of Kerala
 2022 in Kerala
 2023 in India

References 

2020s in Kerala